{{DISPLAYTITLE:C15H10O}}
The molecular formula C15H10O (molar mass: 206.239 g/mol, exact mass: 206.0732 u) may refer to:

 Anthracene-9-carbaldehyde
 Diphenylcyclopropenone (diphencyprone)

Molecular formulas